Tagiades trebellius is a butterfly in the family Hesperiidae (subfamily Pyrginae).

Subspecies
T. t. trebellius (Sulawesi)
T. t. sem Mabille, 1883 (Sangihe, Talaud)
T. t. martinus Plötz, 1884 (Japan)
T. t. mitra Mabille, 1895 (Sula Islands)

Tagiades trebellius martinus larvae feed on Dioscorea alata, D. cirrhosa (Dioscoreaceae).

References

Tagiades
Butterflies described in 1874
Taxa named by Carl Heinrich Hopffer
Butterflies of Asia